Alexander Rafael Romero Galbán (born September 9, 1983) is a Venezuelan professional baseball outfielder with T&A San Marino of the Italian Baseball League.

Career
Romero was born on September 9, 1983. After spending five years in the Twins organization, he was claimed off waivers by the Arizona Diamondbacks on Jan. 19, 2007. Romero began the  season on the Diamondbacks' 25-man roster.

Romero made his major league debut on April 2, 2008, against the Cincinnati Reds, when he came in the game as a pinch hitter, making him the 217th Venezuelan-born player in Major League Baseball. He laid down a successful sacrifice bunt. On April 3, 2008, Romero recorded his first career RBI, when he hit a sacrifice fly as a pinch hitter.  For the season, he batted .230 with a .250 on-base percentage.

During the winter, Romero plays in his home country of Venezuela for the Aragua Tigers (Tigres de Aragua).

In 2012, while playing for Tigres de Quintana Roo, was tested positive for doping and suspended for 50 games to serve in 2013. He played for Rimini Baseball of the Italian Baseball League in 2013, then he accepted to return to Rimini also for the 2014 season.

He signed a minor league deal with the San Francisco Giants on February 22, 2016.

Romero signed with the Rojos del Águila de Veracruz of the Mexican Baseball League for the start of the 2016 season. He was traded to the Toros de Tijuana on June 13, 2016, and later dealt to the Olmecas de Tabasco on November 17, 2016. He was released on June 27, 2017. On June 30, 2017, Romero signed with the Piratas de Campeche. He was released on July 7, 2017.

Romero returned to the Rimini Baseball Club for the 2018 season. He moved to T&A San Marino for the 2019 season. 

Romero was suspended for 20 games for his assault on opposing catcher Gabriel Lino with his bat after being struck by a pitch in a Venezuelan Winter League game on January 9, 2020. After the game, he was quoted as saying “it’s about time us batters defended ourselves.”

See also
 List of Major League Baseball players from Venezuela

References

External links

Venezuelan Professional Baseball League statistics

1983 births
Living people
Arizona Diamondbacks players
Fort Myers Miracle players
Gulf Coast Twins players
Gwinnett Braves players
Jacksonville Suns players
Major League Baseball outfielders
Major League Baseball players from Venezuela
Mexican League baseball outfielders
Mississippi Braves players
New Britain Rock Cats players
New Orleans Zephyrs players
Olmecas de Tabasco players
Piratas de Campeche players
Quad Cities River Bandits players
Reno Aces players
Rimini Baseball Club players
Rochester Red Wings players
Rojos del Águila de Veracruz players
Sportspeople from Maracaibo
Tigres de Aragua players
Tigres de Quintana Roo players
Toros de Tijuana players
Tucson Sidewinders players
Venezuelan expatriate baseball players in Italy
Venezuelan expatriate baseball players in Mexico
Venezuelan expatriate baseball players in the United States
Venezuelan expatriate baseball players in San Marino
World Baseball Classic players of Venezuela
2013 World Baseball Classic players
Venezuelan expatriate baseball players in Colombia